The 1990–91 season saw Leeds United A.F.C. return to the Football League First Division for the first time since 1982 after winning the 1989–90 Football League Second Division. Manager Howard Wilkinson spent heavily on building a team capable of thriving as well as surviving in the First Division, signing goalkeeper John Lukic and midfielder Gary McAllister, as Leeds finished fourth in the league and reached the semi-finals of the Football League Cup.

Squad

Competitions

Football League First Division

League table

Matches

Source:

FA Cup

Source:

Football League Cup

Source:

Full Members' Cup

Source:

Transfers and loans

Transfers in

†Club record transfer fee at the time.

Transfers out

Total spending:  £1,250,000

Loaned in

Loaned out

Top goalscorers

First Division
  Lee Chapman 21
  Carl Shutt 10
  Gordon Strachan 7
  Gary Speed 7
  Mel Sterland 5
  Chris Fairclough 4
  Chris Whyte 3
  Imre Varadi 2
  Gary McAllister 2
  John Pearson 1
  Mike Whitlow 1
  Bobby Davison 1

FA Cup
  Lee Chapman 3
  Mel Sterland 1
  Gary McAllister 1

League Cup (Rumbelows Cup)
  Lee Chapman 4
  Gary Speed 3
  Gary McAllister 2
  Gordon Strachan 1
  Chris Fairclough 1
  Chris Whyte 1

Full Members Cup (Zenith System Data Cup)
  Lee Chapman 3
  Mel Sterland 2
  Imre Varadi 1
  Gary McAllister 1
  Carl Shutt 1
  Gordon Strachan 1
  Andy Williams 1

Awards

FWA Footballer of the Year
 Gordon Strachan

LUFC Player of the Year
 David Batty

Notes

References

Leeds United F.C. seasons
Leeds United
Foot